Harzand railway station (Persian:ايستگاه راه آهن هرزند, Istgah-e Rah Ahan-e Marand) is a locality and railway station in Harzandat-e Sharqi Rural District, in the Central District of Marand County, East Azerbaijan Province, Iran. At the 2006 census, its population was 24, in 6 families. The station is owned by IRI Railway. The station primarily serves the village of Harzand-e Jadid, 6 km to the east, and also other villages of East Harzamdat and West Harzandat rural districts.

References 

Populated places in Marand County
Railway stations in Iran